Asses Ears is a summit in Northwest Arctic Borough, Alaska, in the United States.

The mountain was so named in 1816 by Otto von Kotzebue because "its summit is in the form of two asses' ears".

References

Mountains of Northwest Arctic Borough, Alaska
Mountains of Alaska